Aethes smeathmanniana, or Smeathmann's aethes moth, is a moth of the family Tortricidae. It was described by Johan Christian Fabricius in 1781. It is found in most of Europe, Asia Minor and in North America, where it has been recorded from New Jersey and Newfoundland and Labrador.

Adults are on wing from May to August.

The larvae feed on the seeds of various plants, including Achillea millefolium and Centaurea species. Other recorded food plants include Anthemis cotula, Centaurea nigra and Lactuca sativa.

References

External links

UKMoths

BugGuide

smeathmanniana
Moths described in 1781
Moths of Europe
Moths of Asia
Moths of North America